Ralph DeLancey Izard (26 February 1785 – 21 January 1822) was a United States Navy officer who became a hero for his actions at Tripoli, during the Barbary Wars.  The destroyer USS Izard (DD-589) was named after him.

Early service
Ralph DeLancey Izard was born 26 February 1785 at Charleston, South Carolina, the son of a prominent political family.  His mother was Alice De Lancey Izard, and his father was Senator Ralph Izard, who served as a delegate to the Continental Congress (1782–1783), U.S. Senator from South Carolina (1789–1795), and was President pro tempore of the United States Senate.

Ralph was appointed Midshipman 2 October 1799.

The Burning of the Philadelphia
Izard volunteered and took part in the expedition under Lieutenant Stephen Decatur, commanding the ketch Intrepid, which entered the harbor of Tripoli 16 February 1804 and destroyed the captured U.S. frigate Philadelphia in what Lord Nelson called the most daring act of the age. Izard was assigned duty under Lt. Decatur, with Midshipman John Rowe and 15 men, to hold the spar deck.

Later duty
He also took part in the attacks on Tripoli during August and September 1804 as part of Commodore Edward Preble's squadron.  He was promoted to Lieutenant on 27 January 1807.  Lt. Izard died 21 January 1822 at Charleston, South Carolina.

Marriage
In 1808, Izard married Eliza Pinckney, daughter of Maj-Gen Charles Cotesworth Pinckney, signatory to the Constitution, and a granddaughter of Col Charles Pinckney, chief justice of South Carolina.

Namesake
The destroyer Izard was launched and named in Lt. Izard's honor on 8 August 1942.  She served in the Pacific during World War II, including the battles of Kwajalein, the Philippine Sea, Leyte, and Iwo Jima, among others.  She received 10 battle stars for service.

References

 DANFS entry for USS Izard

1785 births
1822 deaths
American military personnel of the First Barbary War
Burials in South Carolina
Military personnel from Charleston, South Carolina
United States Navy officers
American people of Dutch descent
Izard family
Schuyler family
Van Cortlandt family